The 1965 Chatham Cup was the 38th annual nationwide knockout football competition in New Zealand.

The competition was run on a regional basis, with 18 regional associations holding separate qualification rounds. The winners of each of these qualification tournaments, along with the second-placed team from Auckland, qualified for the competition proper. In all, 104 teams took part in the competition, 33 from the South Island and 71 from the North Island. Note: Different sources record different numbers for the rounds of this competition, with some confusion caused by differing numbers of rounds in regional qualification.

Christchurch City's 19–1 Fifth Round demolition of Timaru's Northern Hearts was the largest known victory in any Chatham Cup match until Metro's 21–0 demolition of Norwest in 1998.

The 1965 Final
The final was played in a stiff Wellington southerly, which St. Kilda captain Alex Caldwell opted to use in the first half. Despite this advantage, the Otago side found themselves on the back foot against a far stronger Auckland team. Suburbs rebuffed St. Kilda's attacks in the first twenty minutes before moving the ball forward themselves. Centre-forward Trefor Pugh scored first for the Auckland side, though Brian Slinn levelled the scores before the break. In the second half, playing with the aid of the wind, Suburbs' class proved too much for the southerners. John Legg added a second for Suburbs 12 minutes into the second spell, and a mistimed clearance from St. Kilda keeper Malcolm Barnes found Pugh, who hit a volley into the St. Kilda goal. The fourth Eastern Suburbs goal came when a shot by John Wrathall was parried straight into the path of Legg, who hit the ball past the keeper into the net.

Results

Third round

Pukekohe won on corners

Fourth round

Oamaru had a bye to the last 16

Fifth round

Quarter-finals

Semi-finals

Final

References

Rec.Sport.Soccer Statistics Foundation New Zealand 1965 page
ultimatenzsoccer.com 1965 Chatham Cup page

Chatham Cup
Chatham Cup
Chatham Cup
September 1965 sports events in New Zealand